Hugh Gardner Manning (19 August 1920 – 18 August 2004) was an English film, radio and television actor. He is best remembered  as the Reverend Donald Hinton, in the soap opera Emmerdale Farm, a role he played from 1977 until 1989. From 1964 to 1965 he appeared in the ITV drama The Sullavan Brothers. He also starred in the tv series Mrs Thursday, alongside Kathleen Harrison in 1966, playing a suave and imperturbable business adviser, which also carried over into popular tv commercials where his character endorsed the qualities of Robinsons barley water. Also in 1966 he appeared in The Avengers in the episode entitled "The Thirteenth Hole" as Colonel Watson. He regularly played Inspector Vosper in the BBC radio detective series, Paul Temple.

Early life
Hugh Gardner Manning was born in Birmingham, Warwickshire in 1920 and educated at Moseley Grammar School. He began his career as a trainee accountant, before joining the Birmingham School of Speech and Drama and becoming an actor. He was an active member of the actor's union Equity, serving as its President in 1975, and an active supporter of the Labour Party

Partial filmography
 The Dam Busters (1955) - Official, Ministry of Aircraft Production
 The Secret Place (1957) - Sergeant Paynter (uncredited)
 Our Man in Havana (1959) - Officer
 G.I. Blues (1960) - Juggler (uncredited)
 The Honey Pot (1967) - Volpone
 Quatermass and the Pit (1967) - Pub Customer
 The House That Dripped Blood (1971) - Mark (segment 3 "Sweets to the Sweet")
 The Mackintosh Man (1973) - Prosecutor
 Rogue Male (1976) - Peale
 The Elephant Man (1980) - Broadneck

References

External links

1920 births
2004 deaths
English male film actors
English male soap opera actors
People from Birmingham, West Midlands
People educated at Moseley School